Sarah X. Miracle (previously known as Sarah Cheng-De Winne) (born 2 December 1987) is a Singaporean soul-pop singer, songwriter, and musician. In 2013, she was named Winner at the 12th Independent Music Awards for her song, "Love-Shape Void" in the Contemporary Christian/Gospel song category. She was also nominated in the R&B/Soul Song category for her song "Diagonal Rain".
She has released two albums, Let's Pretend (2010) and Brand New (2012).
Winne is also recognized for her portrait photography work, her portfolio having been featured on numerous photography blogs. Winne was previously a Radio DJ at MediaCorp's 938LIVE from 2011 to 2012.

Discography 
 Let's Pretend (2010)
 Brand New (2012)
 Candle (2015)
 看见 (2017)
 Don't Say It (2020)

Awards 

 Winner, Contemporary Christian/Gospel Song Category, 12th Independent Music Awards 2013 for "Love-Shape Void"
 Nominated, R&B/Soul Song Category, 12th Independent Music Awards 2013 for "Diagonal Rain"

References

External links 
 sarah.com.sg Sarah Cheng-De Winne Official Website]
 instagram.com/sarahxmiracle Sarah Cheng-De Winne Instagram]

1987 births
Living people
21st-century Singaporean women singers
Singaporean singer-songwriters
Singaporean composers
Singaporean people of Chinese descent
Singaporean Christians
Anglo-Chinese Junior College alumni